Harvest Time at Carditello is a 1791 oil on canvas painting by Jakob Philipp Hackert, who had become a painter to the royal court at Naples. In 1791 he was commissioned to paint frescoes in the 'salottino' of the manorhouse at Carditello, but the cycle was partly destroyed by anti-Bourbon figures following the unification of Italy. 

The painting depicts Ferdinand I of the Two Sicilies and his wife Maria Carolina of Austria standing or sitting under a tree in outdoor country clothes as the peasants busy themselves with the harvest..

The work is now in the National Museum of Capodimonte in Naples, Italy.

Sources
https://web.archive.org/web/20150924075423/http://www.polomusealenapoli.beniculturali.it/museo_cp/museo_cp.html
Touring Club Italiano, Museo di Capodimonte, Milano, Touring Club Editore, 2012. 

1791 paintings
Paintings in the collection of the Museo di Capodimonte
Dogs in art
Farming in art